Bambaiwali (Hindi: बम्बईवाली, The Girl from Bombay) is a Bollywood action adventure film. It was released in 1941. The film was directed by Homi Wadia and produced by Wadia Movietone. It starred Fearless Nadia, John Cawas, Sardar Mansoor, Dalpat and Boman Shroff.

Cast
 Fearless Nadia
 John Cawas
 Sardar Mansur
 Radha Rani
 Bibi
 Dalpat
 Azim
 Mithu Miya
 Boman Shroff

Music
The music director was Madhavlal Damodar Master and the lyricist was Waheed Qureshi. The songs were sung by Sardar Mansoor, Radharani and Fida Hussain.

Song List

References

External links
 

1941 films
1940s Hindi-language films
Films directed by Homi Wadia
Indian black-and-white films
Indian action adventure films
1940s action adventure films